Martin William Kratt (born December 23, 1965) and Christopher Frederick James Kratt (born July 19, 1969), are American zoologists, actors, producers, directors, and educational nature show hosts. Sons of musical-instrument manufacturer William King "Bill" Kratt, the brothers grew up in Warren Township, New Jersey, and together created children's television series Kratts' Creatures, Zoboomafoo, and Be the Creature (which aired on the National Geographic Channel and CBC), as well as Wild Kratts (which airs on PBS Kids and TVOKids).

Early lives and education
Martin was born on December 23, 1965, and Chris was born on July 19, 1969, in New Jersey to Linda (born 1939) and William Kratt (1928-2022). They are the grandsons of musical instrument maker William Jacob Kratt (1892-1983), who emigrated from Germany to America in 1910.

The brothers attended Watchung Hills Regional High School. Both were inducted into the school's hall of fame in 2013.  Martin holds a Bachelor of Science in zoology from Duke University, and Chris holds a Bachelor of Arts in biology from Carleton College.

Career
Shortly after graduating from Duke University, Martin became a research assistant for a howler monkey project under Dr. Kenneth Glander in Costa Rica. Shortly after, he worked with Dr. Patricia Wright in Madagascar as well as Dr. John Terbogh in the Peruvian Amazon. In 1990, Chris served as an intern at Conservation International in Washington, D.C. A year later, he started the Carleton Organization for Biodiversity. His ecology studies have been funded by the Explorers Club and the National Science Foundation. He was also the recipient of the Thomas J. Watson Fellowship. 
Chris also starred alongside his brother Martin in the show Zoboomafoo, which aired from 1999 to 2001. On this PBS kids show, they went on many adventures with animals with the help of Zoboomafoo, a Coquerel's sifaka lemur (Propithecus coquereli).The other shows the brothers created are Wild Kratts, Be the Creature, Kratt's Creatures, and Wild Alaska Live.

From June 13 to August 3, 2008, the brothers appeared in Creature Adventures, a stage show at Dollywood in Pigeon Forge, Tennessee. They also appear as themselves in the Odd Squad episode "Night Shift". Additionally, in the Nature Cat crossover episode “Wild Batts”, the Kratt Brothers voice bat versions of themselves looking for a new home.  They even also appear in the Molly of Denali crossover episode “Cry Wolf” as themselves looking for a missing pack of wolves in that episode with the help of Molly Mabray and her father.

In 2017, Dr Gavin Svenson discovered a new species of mantis and named it Liturgusa krattorum after the brothers for their impact on the educational television genre. A special episode of Wild Kratts was later released to commorate the occasion.

Personal lives
The brothers have lived in Ottawa, Ontario since 2008, where they film and produce their TV series Wild Kratts.

Martin Kratt
Martin is married to Laura Wilkinson and has two sons, Ronan and Gavin, both of whom have had roles on Wild Kratts. Martin had a walk on role as “Officer Hugh Plesky” on the NBC serial Manifest.

Chris Kratt

Chris has two sons, Aidan and Nolan, with his wife Tania Armstrong, an interior designer whom he married in 2000 in Botswana. Like their cousins Gavin and Ronan, Aiden and Nolan have roles in Wild Kratts as animated versions of themselves.

References

External links

Official Kratt Brothers website
 Martin Kratt biography
Chris Kratt biography
Be The Creature Official Site
PBS – Zoboomafoo website

American television personalities
Male television personalities
American male television actors
American male voice actors
Carleton College alumni
People from Warren Township, New Jersey
Watson Fellows
Watchung Hills Regional High School alumni
1965 births
1969 births
Living people
American expatriate male actors in Canada
American people of German descent
American zoologists